Milton "Lil Rel" Howery Jr. (born December 17, 1979) is an American actor and comedian. Howery is known for playing Robert Carmichael in NBC's television comedy series The Carmichael Show (2015–2017) and Transportation Security Administration (TSA) officer Rod Williams in the horror film Get Out (2017). He also starred in the TV series Rel (2018–2019), which he also created and co-produced, lasting only one season.

Early life
Milton Howery Jr. grew up on the West Side of Chicago, the son of Nancy and Milton. He attended Providence St. Mel School from fifth grade to ninth. He then transferred to Crane High School. At Crane, Howery wrote jokes and created a script in a senior talent show, after which he decided to pursue comedy professionally. Playing high school basketball, he reminded people of his older cousin Darrel, and was nicknamed Lil Rel.

Career
Howery began performing stand-up comedy on Chicago's East Side at the Lion's Den. He made his television debut in January 2007 on the reality television competition Last Comic Standing. The same year, he was on P. Diddy Presents: The Bad Boys of Comedy on HBO. In 2009, he was part of America's National Night Out Against Crime in Chicago.

In 2012, Howery and five other comedians starred in Fox's revival of the 1990s sketch program In Living Color. The show was canceled in 2013. Howery went on to work as a writer, producer, and one of the regular cast members of the truTV sketch comedy series Friends of the People. In 2015, he began co-starring as Bobby Carmichael on the NBC sitcom The Carmichael Show alongside the show's creator, Jerrod Carmichael.

In early 2016, Netflix added Howery's first exclusive solo stand-up special, Kevin Hart Presents: Lil Rel: , for streaming in the United States.

Howery won the 2017 "Best Comedic Performance" MTV Movie & TV Award for his performance in Jordan Peele's satirical horror film Get Out.

On May 10, 2018, Fox picked up Rel, a sitcom starring Howery in the lead role and Jerrod Carmichael and Mike Scully serving as executive producers. Howery said the show is loosely based on his own life, including being a divorced father. The series premiered September 9, 2018.

Howery starred alongside Ryan Reynolds in the comedy film Free Guy. He played Buddy, a security guard.

Since 2019, Howery has played the character Bishop on the HBO Max sitcom South Side.

In 2019, HBO released Howery's second stand-up special, Lil Rel Howery: Live in Crenshaw. His third special, I said it. Y'all thinking it. was filmed in his hometown of Chicago and released in 2022.

Personal life
Howery married Verina Robinson on November 24, 2008. They have two children. The couple divorced in 2017.

In June 2016, Howery was a passenger in a vehicle that struck another car in University Village, Chicago. The driver in the other car argued with Howery and called 9-1-1, claiming that Howery had punched him in the face. The driver of the car in which Howery was riding drove away without him. Police officers arrested Howery on a charge of misdemeanor battery, but he was found not guilty. The driver sued Howery for injuries suffered during the fight.

Filmography

Film

Television

References

External links

Living people
African-American stand-up comedians
American stand-up comedians
American male television actors
Male actors from Chicago
21st-century American male actors
American male comedians
Comedians from Illinois
1979 births
21st-century American comedians
21st-century African-American people